Béla Darányi (22 April 1894 – 6 January 1949) was a Hungarian sports shooter. He competed in 300m metre military rifle three positions event at the 1912 Summer Olympics.

References

External links
 

1894 births
1949 deaths
Hungarian male sport shooters
Olympic shooters of Hungary
Shooters at the 1912 Summer Olympics
Sport shooters from Budapest